Chacombe Priory (or Chalcombe Priory) was a priory of Augustinian canons at Chacombe, Northamptonshire, England.

Hugh of Chalcombe, lord of the manor of Chacombe, founded the priory in the reign of Henry II (1154–89). on low-lying land just west of the village close to the stream. Hugh gave the priory endowments including a yardland at South Newington. In about 1225 the priory's property included eight tenements in Banbury, seven of which it retained until the Dissolution of the Monasteries in the 1530s. By the time of the Hundred Rolls in 1279 the priory owned a tenement in Warwick, where it expanded its holdings until it owned a substantial number of tenements and cottages by the time of the Dissolution.

On 27 September 1535 Sir John Tregonwell reported to Thomas Cromwell:
At Chacombe the prior is newly come, and is competently well learned in Holy Scripture. He is bringing into some order his canons, who are rude and unlearned. I am only afraid that he is too familiar and easy with them.

When the priory was suppressed in 1536 its property included land at Boddington, Northamptonshire, Rotherby, Leicestershire and Wardington, Oxfordshire, and a tenement at Thorpe Mandeville. Today the only visible remains of the priory are a small chapel apparently built in the 13th century and a set of mediaeval fishponds. However, at least three medieval stone coffin slabs, including one from the 13th century, have been found in the priory grounds.

Part of the priory site is now occupied by a house, also called Chacombe Priory. The house has a large Elizabethan porch and a late 17th-century staircase, and was remodelled in the Georgian era. The house is a Grade II* listed building.

Burials at the Priory
Nicholas de Segrave, 1st Baron Segrave and his wife Maud
John Segrave, 2nd Baron Segrave
Stephen de Segrave, 3rd Baron Segrave (d. 1325)

References

Sources

12th-century establishments in England
1536 disestablishments in England
Augustinian monasteries in England
Christian monasteries established in the 12th century
Monasteries in Northamptonshire